Yoon Ji-min (born Yoon Ji-young) is a South Korean actress and model. She played Ji in the period action series Warrior Baek Dong-soo.

Personal life
She married actor Kwon Min (Kwon Hae-sung) on July 13, 2013 at THE RAUM, Seoul.  On December 20, 2014, Ji-min gave birth to her daughter.

Filmography

Film

Television series

Web series

Television  show
 Our Cha Cha Cha (2022) - Cast Member 
 Actress House Seasons 1-2 ( 2011)
 Rollercoaster (2010)
 Real Story 묘 (2009)

Theater
 Proposal  (2011)

Awards
 2006 SBS Drama Awards: New Star Award (Korea Secret Agency)

References

External links

 Yoon Ji-min at Cyworld
 Yoon Ji-min at S&U Entertainment
 

South Korean television actresses
South Korean film actresses
Living people

South Korean female models
Dongduk Women's University alumni